Chernes is a genus of pseudoscorpions belonging to the family Chernetidae.

The genus was first described by Menge in 1855.

The species of this genus are found in Europe and Northern America.

Species:
 Chernes cimicoides (Fabricius, 1793)

References

Chernetidae
Pseudoscorpion genera